Yuriy Serhiyovych Kozyrenko (born 27 November 1999) is a Ukrainian professional footballer who plays as a striker for Vorskla Poltava.

Career
Kozyrenko is a product of Kolyps-Shturm Kostopil and Dynamo Kyiv Youth Sportive School Systems.

In August 2018 he signed contract with Vorskla Poltava and he made his debut for FC Vorskla in a winning game against FC Kolos Kovalivka on 24 August 2019 in the Ukrainian Premier League.

References

External links

1999 births
Living people
People from Kostopil
Ukrainian footballers
Association football forwards
Ukraine youth international footballers
Ukrainian expatriate footballers
FC Vorskla Poltava players
FC Hirnyk-Sport Horishni Plavni players
FC Isloch Minsk Raion players
Ukrainian Premier League players
Ukrainian First League players
Belarusian Premier League players
Expatriate footballers in Belarus
Ukrainian expatriate sportspeople in Belarus
Sportspeople from Rivne Oblast